is a video game character appearing in various games from SNK. Rock makes his first appearance as a playable character in the fighting game Garou: Mark of the Wolves, the last chapter in the Fatal Fury series, as the new lead character from the series. Rock appears in the series as the son of Geese Howard, the main antagonist from the previous Fatal Fury games, who fell to his death after refusing to be saved by Terry Bogard. However, Terry adopted Rock in order to put his past with Geese behind him, and helped teach Rock how to fight. Besides his appearance in Mark of the Wolves, Rock is featured in few games from The King of Fighters series, as well as various crossovers from SNK. He was voiced by Eiji Takemoto since debut until Maximum Impact Regulation A, later voiced by Yuuma Uchida. In the English edition of KOF: Maximum Impact, he is voiced by Jon Thomas and by Mike Lane in its sequel.

Rock has also been featured in manwhua adaptations from the games he has appeared as well as the anime The King of Fighters Another Day and The King of Fighters: Destiny. Rock's character has received various responses from video games publications. His debut in Mark of the Wolves has been highly praised by reviewers although some of them considered his character to be too strong in comparison to the others, although his development in the KOF: Maximum Impact series has been criticized due to his English voice actor and his new outfit.

Conception and design

Rock Howard was designed as the new lead character of the Fatal Fury series by Nobuyuki Kuroki in 1998. Both he and Yasuyuki Oda wondered what type of hero would succeed Terry Bogard in Fatal Furys latest game, Garou: Mark of the Wolves. While they were not confident with Rock, they still decided to make him as the new protagonist. Rock was designed to contrast previous masculine Fatal Fury characters by giving him a more bishonen appearance, something Kuroki felt the sequel needed to balance the cast.

In his development blog for KOF: Maximum Impact 2, Ureshino states that he does not know about Rock's mother or the true inheritor of Geese's legacy but hints that it would most likely conflict with Terry if SNK released another game involving them. For The King of Fighters XIV, Rock was considered for inclusion. Although Geese's appearance resulted in the development team finding it complicated to proceed with this plan, as Mark of the Wolves occurs years after Geese's death in the Fatal Fury series, they ultimately changed their minds and included Rock as a DLC character. According to Oda, Rock was originally a weak character in his own debut. As a result, the staff highly reworked Rock's fighting style for The King of Fighters XIV in order simultaneously strengthen him and heighten his popularity. At the same time, SNK wanted Rock to retain many of his original traits from Mark of the Wolves, such as the way he adjusts his gloves.

Several of the Miera brothers' prototype designs were assigned to other characters' alternate outfits; in this case, Alba's prototype design became Rock's alternate outfit. Two of his extra outfits from KOF: Maximum Impact 2 are also cosplays from Kaede, the lead character from The Last Blade (this is in contrast to the similarities between Sakura Mitsukoshi from Face's Money Puzzle Exchanger and Sakura Kinomoto from Clamp's Cardcaptor Sakura, as both of them have green eyes and voiced by Sakura Tange, Eiji Takemoto's then castmate in Aoni Production), and Kain R. Heinlein, the final boss from Garou: Mark of the Wolves.

Attributes
In spite of his father's ways, Rock is a warm, friendly and compassionate young man, possessing Terry's strong sense of justice and heroism. Every day, Rock fights off his evil side and tries to get out of the shadow of his father. He is the middle term between Geese's excessive evil and Terry's excessive festive personality. Rock is also a very compassionate man, offering to help those in need, such as helping Hotaru Futaba to find her older brother. He also tends to be very uncomfortable and nervous around women, having been raised by men nearly all of his life.

His move list is an amalgam of Terry and Geese. Also, his Crack Counter is a reversal that can be directed high or low akin to Geese, where upon succeeding, Rock slams an opponent with a kick that resembles Terry's Crack Shot. In comparison with his father, Rock still lacks the control over his "evil blood", which boils from time to time to the point of hurting him after ending a fight with the Raging Storm and the Deadly Rave. Thus, most of moves taken from his father take him more time for recovering or are less powerful. Despite this, the precedent of his lineage states that Rock has not reached the top of his potential yet.

Appearances
Rock makes his first appearance in Fatal Fury 3: Road to the Final Victory, in which it is revealed how he becomes friends with Terry Bogard. After Geese falls to his death by refusing Terry's help, Terry adopts Rock, whom he takes care of like his son. Rock becomes a playable character in Garou: Mark of the Wolves, having both lived with Terry and studied martial arts under him for ten years. During this time, a new King of Fighters tournament arose under the name "Maximum Mayhem", which Rock and Terry both decide to compete in. By the end of the tournament, Rock finds his final opponent is Kain R. Heinlein, who reveals himself to be both the host and Rock's uncle. Kain, aware that Geese Howard's will held presumably valuable secrets but unable to discover them without assistance, wins Rock's aid in working through the document by offering information regarding Rock's mother—whom Kain claimed was still alive. Terry accepts Rock's decision to become Kain's new partner, with Rock promising to return.

Despite making several cameos in games from The King of Fighters series, Rock was only playable in the spin-off games KOF: Maximum Impact and Maximum Impact 2 for several years. Both games feature Rock entering into King of Fighters tournaments developed in Southtown prior to the events of Mark of the Wolves. Rock makes his first playable appearance in a mainline King of Fighters title in The King of Fighters XIV, being added to the game via post-launch downloadable content. However his canonical first participation on the team-based tournament is in The King of Fighters XV, where he is a new leader of the DLC Team Garou. Rock also appears as a playable character in the crossover video games NeoGeo Battle Coliseum and Capcom vs. SNK 2.

Rock also appears in the 2006 original net animation The King of Fighters: Another Day. In the second episode Rock finds Lien Neville fighting Billy Kane, Geese's former right-hand man, in the Geese Tower. As Lien is about to be killed, Rock saves her, which enrages Billy as he cannot believe that he is Geese's son. As Billy attacks Rock, Lien shoots a laser that takes Billy out of the tower. Memories of Stray Wolves, a twenty-minute featurette serves as a retrospective of the Fatal Fury series, with Terry narrating the events of the games to Rock. The first seven volumes from the manhua The King of Fighters 2003 by Wing Yen features a short chapter from Garou: Mark of the Wolves based on Rock's training with Terry. In the last of the chapters, Rock fights Grant, who is revealed to be a childhood friend who always protected him. Despite feeling sad for fighting his friend, Rock defeats Grant in order to meet the host of the Maximum Mayhem tournament, his uncle, Kain.

A young Rock appears in the 2017 webseries, The King of Fighters: Destiny. In episode eleven, Rock meets Terry at a coffee shop. He is caught by a worker attempting to steal food, so he pretends that Terry is his father to escape trouble. After learning that the boy has no one to raise him, Terry promises to adopt Rock as his son after he defeats Geese. Terry's display of kindness towards Rock also convinces Angelina to stop herself from poisoning him.

Rock is featured in The King of Fighters All Star, and makes a cameo in the King of Fighters Stadium stage in Super Smash Bros. Ultimate.

Reception
Rock was voted as the number one favorite character with 190 votes at the time of his debut in Garou: Mark of the Wolves in a popularity poll from such game developed by SNK. Video games publications have commented on Rock's character, with most of them praising his debut and development in various game.  Anthony Chau from IGN noted Rock to be one of the most notable characters from Mark of the Wolves. However, he commented that his moveset was very unbalanced in comparison to the ones from other characters, becoming one of the strongest characters from the game. Gamesarefun.com writer Andrew McClure labelled Rock's moves to be a cross between Terry Bogard and Geese Howard with the exception of Geese's "pretzel" strongest moves. He additionally liked Rock's development in various games, praising his appearance in Capcom vs. SNK 2. Greg Kasavin from GameSpot agreed on this, praising him to be one of the most notable additions from Capcom vs. SNK 2.

Kurt Kalata from Armchairempire liked the creation of NeoGeo Battle Coliseum as it allowed players to use both Geese and Rock for the first time (which is actually inaccurate; the first game where both characters were playable was Capcom vs. SNK 2) due to how story is behind these two characters and how popular they are. Like Chau from IGN, Kasavin from GameSpot also complained on how much powerful and fast was Rock but in KOF: Maximum Impact, commenting that he has "no real weakness" even though if the player uses his moves several times. Jon Thomas, Rock's English voice actor for KOF: Maximum Impact has been criticized by Ryan Genno from Gamingtarget.com to be one of the worst from the game as gives Rock "as much emotion as a block of cheese". The alternative costume for his character in KOF: Maximum Impact 2 has also been criticized by Luke Albiges from Eurogamer who noted it to just look "plain wrong", ruining Rock's "seminal badass" appearance. Den of Geek found Rock's debut in KOFs main series with The King of Fighters XIV interesting due to the fact in this timeline his father is alive unlike in the Fatal Fury one. Rock's revelation as a DLC was leaked by fans; this angered Oda who wanted to surprise fans with the official trailer. Nevertheless, Oda hoped the fans would enjoy playing as him.

In November 2019, mangaka Itokatsu known for writing Silver Nina made her own sketch of Rock in tribute of the anniversary of Mark of the Wolves.

References

External links
Rock's profile and story at Neo Geo Battle Coliseum official website 

Fatal Fury characters
Fictional American people in video games
Fictional kobudōka
Fictional male martial artists
Fictional martial artists in video games
Fictional mixed martial artists
Male characters in video games
SNK protagonists
Teenage characters in video games
The King of Fighters characters
Video game characters introduced in 1999